Rucka Rucka Ali (born January 27, 1987) is an Israeli-American rapper, singer, radio personality, comedian, YouTuber, and parodist. He is best known for his dark humor, political and topical song parodies on YouTube. Much of his content pokes fun at ethnic, racial, and religious stereotypes. As of February 2022, he has amassed 331 million views and 1.759 million subscribers over his six channels on YouTube. He has released eight independent studio albums, four of which have charted in the Billboard Top Comedy Albums.

Early life 
Rucka Rucka Ali was born in Jerusalem, Israel, on January 27, 1987, into an Orthodox Jewish environment, though he has stated that he moved away from that lifestyle as he grew up.

Career
Rucka Rucka Ali has released eight total albums, four of which have charted in the Billboard Top Comedy Albums: I'm Black, You're White & These Are Clearly Parodies peaked at 6th, Probably Racist peaked at 11th, Rucka's World peaked at 8th, and Black Man of Steal peaked at 7th. During the weeks of July 31, 2010, through August 7, 2010, Rucka Rucka Ali held 5 of the top 10 spots on the Billboard Comedy Digital Tracks chart.
On January 22, 2023, Rucka went live on Instagram. The stream was named "With Andrew Tate" which made fans think he was streaming with Andrew Tate. He never went live with Tate, but he did go live with some of his fans, who he dubs "Rucka's Nuckas". One of the "Nuckas", named Nikolas White, performed Rucka's latest song (at the time) "Top G" with him. White played guitar and sang backup vocals with Rucka.

Controversies
In June 2010, three British students were reprimanded after publicly showing Rucka Rucka Ali's music video for his hit parody "Ima Korean" to their class while studying different countries' musical traditions. One South Korean student was "devastated, upset, very offended, and feeling very lonely", being the only East-Asian child in the class. An assistant headteacher, Len Idle, said the song was "probably racist". Rucka Rucka Ali subsequently picked the quote as the title of his next album, Probably Racist.

On July 24, 2013, Rucka Rucka Ali released the song "Zayn Did 9/11" (a parody of Selena Gomez's "Come & Get It") to YouTube which mocked then-One Direction member Zayn Malik, jokingly saying he committed the September 11 terrorist attacks. The single cover features a silhouette of Malik in front of the Twin Towers of the World Trade Center as they were attacked. The song, along with an accompanying music video released several days later, angered One Direction fans and others. Business Standard called the song "offensive" and a "racist attack" on Malik.

In the end of November 2013, he was involved in another controversy after his song "Only 17", a parody of "Just a Dream" by Nelly, was accidentally played uncensored over the speakers at a McDonald's company in Wales. Subsequently, McDonald's issued an apology to the offended customers. That same week, Rucka Rucka Ali responded to the controversy on his YouTube channel by jokingly demanding a personal apology from the restaurant.

Personal life
Rucka Rucka Ali has stated that he is an objectivist, as in his 2017 interview with Dave Rubin on The Rubin Report.

At the end of the music video for his parody song "Life Is Over" (a parody of "Closer"), released in October 2016, Rucka Rucka Ali admitted that he had a suicide attempt in the summer of 2006. Noting that his death would have prevented the success of his later music career, he wished to send others "a message of hope".

Discography

References

External links

1987 births
Living people
American male comedians
American satirists
American parodists
Rappers from Michigan
People from Troy, Michigan
Israeli emigrants to the United States
Jewish rappers
Midwest hip hop musicians
Objectivists
Obscenity controversies in music
21st-century American rappers
21st-century American comedians
Unidentified musicians
Parody musicians
Comedians from Michigan
YouTubers from Michigan
Musicians from Jerusalem